The 2011–12 Latvian Football Cup is the seventieth season of the Latvian annual football knock-out competition.  The winners will qualify for the second qualifying round of the 2012–13 UEFA Europa League.

First round
The matches of this round took place between 29 May and 6 June 2011.

|}
1Match originally ended 3–1.

Second round
The 11 winners from the First round and Zelis Gulbene, who received a bye into this round, competed in this stage of the competition. These matches took place between 14 and 21 June 2011.

|}
2Match not played; both teams advance.

Third round
Entering this round were the 6 winners from the previous round and 10 teams who enter the competition in this round. These matches took place between 1 and 17 July 2011.

|}

Fourth round
On 17 July 2011, two winners from the previous round played each other for a spot in this stage of the competition.

|}

This winner, the remaining 6 winners from the previous round and the remaining 9 teams from the Latvian Higher League competed in this stage of the competition. These matches took place on 30 and 31 July 2011.

|}

Quarterfinals

Semifinals

Final

References

External links
 LFF.lv

2011-12
2011–12 domestic association football cups
Cup
Cup